Bambadjani is a village on the island of Grande Comore (Ngazidja) in the Comoros. According to the 1991 census, the village had a population of 1020. Bouni lies to the east of the village on the coast.

References

Populated places in Grande Comore